Freedom, Love and the Recuperation of the Human Mind is the eleventh studio album by Australian singer Ben Lee. It was recorded at Lee's home in Lauren Canyon, California, as well as the home of Grant-Lee Phillips in Nashville, Tennessee. It was released on 21 October 2016.

Background 

In an interview with AAA Backstage, Ben Lee talked of Freedom, Love and The Recuperation of the Human Mind as being a concept album dedicated to winning back the right to think for ourselves:

Lee also claimed in an interview with The Sydney Morning Herald that the album was the sparsest he had made in his career to-date, with inspiration from folk music traditions and lyrics revolving around concepts such as domestic bliss with his wife, Ione Skye, and advice to his children:

Reception 

Freedom, Love and the Recuperation of the Human Mind was rated at three-out-of-five stars by Rolling Stone (Australia)s Jaymz Clements, who explained, "Lee walks a blurred line of dewey-eyed idealistic optimism and insufferable pretension, but his transition from precocious pop maestro to folksy 'adult' pop has been quietly impressive." Music Feeds Mike Honen observed, "International tensions are at an all-time high, the environment is evaporating before us and the weather is so inconsistent none of us know what to wear. The world right now really needs the soothing contemplations of [Lee]." Craig Mathieson of The Sydney Morning Herald felt, "Influenced by the folk music tradition, it's the sparsest album Lee has made, with the lyrics in the foreground."

Track listing

 "What's Good Is Good" – 3:08
 "The Enemy Within" – 3:59
 "Cosmic Science" – 3:12
 "Bigger Than Me" – 3:51
 "Land of Criminals" – 3:16
 "Two Questions" – 3:22
 "Thunder" – 4:03
 "Simple Gospel" – 5:00
 "Rebel Eagle" – 4:02

Personnel

Musicians
Ben Lee – vocals, acoustic guitar
Grant-Lee Phillips – banjo, guitar, keyboards, vocals, bass, melodica
Dan Antunovich – bass
Nick Gaffaney – drums, percussion
Edo Khan – guitar
Alexander Burke – keyboards, vibraphone, guitar, piano
Kerenza Peacock – violin
Sara Watkins – vocals

Production
Jose Alcantar – mixing
Hans Dekline – mastering
Ben Lee – writer

References

2016 albums
Ben Lee albums